Lendi may refer to either of the following rivers of India:

 Lendi, a tributary of the Manjira River
 Lendi, a tributary of the Purna River

See also 
 Lahndi (disambiguation) 
 Lendi Vexer, an Argeninian trip hop duo
 Lendy, a village in Poland